Bernard "Barney" Friery (February 1843 or 1844 – August 17, 1866) was a New York City criminal and independent gang leader during the 1850s and 1860s. Along with five or six others, he entered the East Houston Street saloon of Henry Lazarus on the morning of January 3, 1865. One of the men, California Jack, offered a wager of $100 challenging anyone in the bar to a fight with one of the gang members. When no one responded to their offer, California Jack offered $10 to any man who could take the owner Henry Lazarus's pistol away from him. Having no pistol on him, Lazarus declined their offer.

Friery then walked toward Lazarus offering to shake his hand and, when he refused, stabbed the saloon owner in the throat with a dirk, killing him instantly. Arrested soon after, he appeared before Judge Abraham D. Russell at the Court of General Sessions and convicted of first degree murder on February 17, 1865. Sentenced to death, he was executed by hanging on August 17, 1866 at the age of 22.

See also
 Capital punishment in New York (state)
 Capital punishment in the United States
 List of people executed in New York

General references
Asbury, Herbert. The Gangs of New York. New York: Alfred A. Knopf, 1928. 
Byrnes, Thomas. 1886 Professional Criminals of America. New York: Chelsea House Publishers, 1969.
Two Executions. The New York Times (1866-08-18). Retrieved on 2007-11-22.

1844 births
1866 deaths
1865 murders in the United States
19th-century executions by New York (state)
Gang members of New York City
American people convicted of murder
People executed for murder
19th-century executions by the United States
People executed by New York (state) by hanging
Executed people from New York (state)
People convicted of murder by New York (state)
19th-century executions of American people